Turuvanur  is a village in Chitradurga taluk in the south Indian state of Karnataka.

Demographics
As of the 2001 India census, Turuvanur had a population of 13,809 with 7,073 males and 6,736 females.

Geography 
Turuvanur is a Village Panchayat. It is 22 km from the Talluk and District headquarter Chitradurga. This Panchayat is under the Legislative Assembly of Challakere.

History 
Sthala Purana says, Turuvanur was ruled by an empire of Nayakas of Chitradurga. The people were in the business of cattle (gollas). They used to come daily to this place for cattle food. The people constructed a temple called "Turuvappa Devaru". 

Turuvanuru is known for Karnataka's former chief minister Sri. S. Nijalingappa because of the great "Eachalu Marada Chaluvali". He resigned to become a freedom fighter. Many people were arrested as part of the struggle. The Government of Karnataka created a memorial called "Gandhi Kote".

Etymology 
The word "turuva" means "cattle".

Culture 
One of the most famous Thipperudra Swamy fairs in Karnataka is held in Nayakana Hatti, 14 km distance from Turuvanuru. 

Nearby peoples include Lingayats, Kunchitagas, Devangas, Nayakas, Gollas (Yadavs), Kurubas, Madiga, Bhovi, Uppara, Kunchitigas and Reddy.

Economy 
Most inhabitants depend on agriculture.The agricultural land is of BLACK cotton soil suitable for cultivation of cotton,jawar,tordal. Rain dependent agriculture.Inhabitants like Kuruba community  economically very sound  by rearing Sheep's goats and production of hand made sheep wool handloom products from sheepwool

See also
 Chitradurga
 Districts of Karnataka

References

External links
 http://Chitradurga.nic.in/

Villages in Chitradurga district